Hit the Road may refer to:

 Hit the Road (1941 film), American crime comedy film
 Hit the Road (2021 film), Iranian comedy-drama film
 Hit the Road (TV series), 2017 American comedy series